Kozyrev (masculine) or Kozyreva (feminine) is a Russian surname. Notable people with the surname include:

 Andrey Kozyrev (born 1951), Russian politician
 Lyubov Kozyreva (disambiguation), multiple people
 Nikolai Aleksandrovich Kozyrev (1908-1983), Soviet astronomer and astrophysicist
 Nikolai Ivanovich Kozyrev (1934-2021), Soviet and Russian diplomat
 Yuri Kozyrev (born 1963), Russian photojournalist
 Stanislav Kozyrev (born 1987), Russian footballer

See also
 2536 Kozyrev, main-belt asteroid
 Kozyrev (crater), lunar crater

Russian-language surnames